Mitchells & Butlers plc (also referred to as "M&B") runs circa 1,784 managed pubs, bars and restaurants throughout the United Kingdom. The company's headquarters are in Birmingham, England. The company is listed on the London Stock Exchange and is a constituent of the FTSE 250 Index.

Its branded restaurants and bars include All Bar One, Miller & Carter, Nicholson's, Toby Carvery, Harvester, Browns Restaurants, Vintage Inns, Ember Inns, Son of Steak, Stonehouse Pizza & Grill, Crown Carveries, O'Neill’s, Premium Country Pubs, and Sizzling Pubs. The company also owns the ALEX brand based in Germany.

History

Historic brewing company

Mitchells & Butlers Brewery was formed by the merger of two breweries in 1898. The company merged with Bass in 1961. With the brand currently under ownership of Coors Brewers, the brewery closed in 2002 with production switched to Burton upon Trent. Their most famous beer was Brew XI (using Roman numerals, and so pronounced Brew Eleven), advertised with the slogan "for the men of the Midlands". It is now brewed under licence for Coors by Brains of Cardiff.

Bass
Bass plc, based in Burton-on-Trent, transformed into separate brewing and retail divisions following the Beer Orders of 1989 and then proceeded to build a large hotel portfolio alongside its bingo, betting and electronic leisure interests. In the late 1990s the latter interests were sold. On 21 July 1995, Bass bought 78 Harvester restaurants for £165 million from the Forte Group.

Six Continents
In 2000, Bass also divested its brewing arm and rebranded itself Six Continents before another split in April 2003 into two separate companies, with the hotel assets forming InterContinental Hotels Group and the Mitchells & Butlers name brought back for the pubs and restaurants company. In March 2003, Six Continents fought off a proposed £5.5 billion takeover by Hugh Osmond (Punch Taverns).

M and B
Mitchells & Butlers was formed on 15 April 2003. In April 2006, it was approached by a consortium led by Robert Tchenguiz in a £2.7 billion takeover, which was dropped in May 2006. In February 2008, Punch Taverns offered to merge with Mitchells & Butlers, but decided not to in April 2008. Mitchells & Butlers then took an interest in Punch's subsidiary, Spirit Group.

Financial loss

In January 2008, Mitchells & Butlers announced significant losses (£274 million) arising out of closure of hedge positions taken in anticipation of a property joint venture that were eventually cancelled due to the credit crunch caused by the subprime mortgage financial crisis.

Acquisitions
By 2006, Mitchells & Butlers had 130 Harvester restaurants. In 2001, it added Arena, Ember Inns, Flares, Goose, Sizzling Pub Co, Browns, Alex (in Germany), and Inn Keeper's Lodge to its list of brands. In July 2006, Mitchells & Butlers purchased 239 pub restaurants (Beefeater and Brewers Fayre without a Premier Inn) from Whitbread for £497 million to strengthen its food business ahead of the introduction of a smoking ban in enclosed public spaces in England in 2007. It had first announced its interest in April 2006. In July 2008, Mitchells & Butlers bought 44 more former Brewers Fayre and Beefeater outlets from Whitbread in exchange for 21 Holiday Inn hotels. The acquired sites were rebranded into Mitchells and Butlers flagship brands Harvester and Toby Carvery. In September 2010, Mitchells & Butlers bought the 22 restaurants of the (upmarket) Ha Ha! chain from the Bay Restaurant Group for £19.5 million. Twelve were turned into All Bar One and six into Browns Restaurants. The Ha Ha! brand disappeared.

In June 2014, the company announced plans to acquire the bulk of one of its major competitors, Orchid Group, for £266 million. The acquisition included 173 pubs.

Sale of pubs
In October 2006, Mitchells & Butlers sold off 102 of its smaller community pubs to Chorley-based Trust Inns for £101 million. On 15 July 2010, it was announced that Travelodge had acquired the leases of 52 Innkeeper's Lodge Hotels around Glasgow, Birmingham, Liverpool, Northampton, Milton Keynes and Leeds areas from Mitchells & Butlers. It also sold 12 Hollywood Bowl outlets in August 2010 for £39 million to AMF Bowling and 13 to Tenpin. In November 2010, Mitchells & Butlers sold 333 pubs to the Stonegate Pub Company (of London and owned by TDR Capital) or £373 million.

Poor results and dismissal of CEO
In September 2015, Mitchells & Butlers issued a profits warning and dismissed CEO Alistair Darby. He was replaced by Phil Urban, who joined as COO in January from Grosvenor Casinos and previously ran Whitbread's pub restaurants division.

Operations
Mitchells & Butlers owns several brands of pubs, including:

 Alex
 All Bar One
 Browns Restaurants
 Castle
 Crown Carveries
 Ember Inns
 Harvester
 Innkeeper's Lodge
 Oak Tree
 Orchid Pubs
 Premium Country Pubs (formerly Premium Country Dining Group)
 Miller and Carter
 Nicholson's
 O'Neill's
 Sizzling Pubs
 Stonehouse Pizza & Carvery
 Toby Carvery
 Vintage Inns

Nicholson's pubs tend to be historic pubs aimed at the tourist market, located in London and other historic cities. Amongst Mitchells & Butlers' portfolio is Ye Olde Fighting Cocks, a St Albans public house listed by the Guinness Book of Records as being the United Kingdom's oldest.

References

External links
 Mitchells & Butlers plc

 
Companies based in Smethwick
Restaurants established in 2003
Companies listed on the London Stock Exchange
Defunct breweries of the United Kingdom
Tavistock Group
2003 establishments in England